Seyed Abdollah Mojtabavi (January 4, 1925 – January 13, 2012) was an Iranian welterweight freestyle wrestler. He won bronze medals at the 1951 World Championships and 1952 Summer Olympics.

References

External links
 

1925 births
2012 deaths
Wrestlers at the 1952 Summer Olympics
Iranian male sport wrestlers
Olympic bronze medalists for Iran
Olympic medalists in wrestling
World Wrestling Championships medalists
Medalists at the 1952 Summer Olympics